Montreuil-sur-Mer (or , literally Montreuil on Sea; also ) is a sub-prefecture in the Pas-de-Calais department, northern France. It was known officially as Montreuil until 31 December 2022. It is located on the Canche river, not far from Étaples. The sea, however, is now some distance away. Montreuil-sur-Mer station has rail connections to Arras and Étaples.

Sights
Montreuil-sur-Mer is surrounded by notable brickwork ramparts, constructed after the destruction of the town by troops of Habsburg emperor Charles V in June 1537. These fortifications pre-date the extensive fortification of towns in northern France by Sébastien Le Prestre de Vauban in the 17th century.

History

Montreuil-sur-Mer was the headquarters of the British Army in France during the First World War from March 1916 until it closed in April 1919. The military academy there provided excellent facilities for GHQ.

Montreuil-sur-Mer was chosen as GHQ for a wide variety of reasons. It was on a main road from London to Paris—the two chief centers of the campaign—though not on a main railway line, which would have been an inconvenience. It was not an industrial town and so avoided the complications alike of noise and of a possibly troublesome civil population. It was from a telephone and motor transit point of view in a very central situation to serve the needs of a Force which was based on Dunkirk, Calais, Boulogne, Dieppe, and Le Havre, and had its front stretching from the River Somme to beyond the Belgian frontier.

Haig staff member Sir Frank Fox OBE wrote a critically acclaimed contemporary account of the headquarters in 1916, originally published under the pseudonym "GSO", called G.H.Q. (Montreuil-sur-Mer) His work in the QMG's Directorate in the final offensive against the German Army resulted in his being awarded the OBE (Military) He was also Mentioned in Despatches.

There is a plaque on the château wall to commemorate this.

King George V, accompanied by Haig, made a triumphant passage through Montreuil-sur-Mer on his way to Paris on 27 November 1918.

A statue of Haig on horseback, commemorating his stay, can be seen outside the theatre on the Place Charles de Gaulle. During the German occupation of the town during the Second World War, the statue was taken down. It was never found and is thought to have been melted down. It was rebuilt in the 1950s, using the sculptor's original mould.

Demographics

Literature
Laurence Sterne visited the town in 1765. He recounted his visit through the eyes of the narrator of his novel A Sentimental Journey Through France and Italy (1768).

In Victor Hugo's novel Les Misérables (1862), Montreuil-sur-Mer is the setting for much of volume I, "Fantine," being the hometown of the eponymous heroine. In early English-language editions, the town is identified only as M-sur-M__, and the name is changed entirely in some film adaptations. E.g., the 1998 film directed by Bille August calls it "Vigaud," a pun on Victor Hugo. However, the English-language version of the popular Schönberg-Boublil musical, and all screen adaptations thereof, restore the full name in the on-screen title cards, although it is never spoken in the libretto.

International relations

Montreuil-sur-Mer is twinned with Slough, England, UK.

Gallery

See also
Communes of the Pas-de-Calais department

References

External links

 The equestrian statue of Field Marshal Haig on the website "Remembrance Trails of the Great War in Northern France"

Communes of Pas-de-Calais
Subprefectures in France